Sichuan Annapurna Football Club was a former professional football club that participated in the China League One under licence from the Chinese Football Association (CFA). The team was based in Dujiangyan City, Chengdu, Sichuan and their home stadium was the Dujiangyan Phoenix Stadium that has a seating capacity of 12,700. Their majority shareholders were Sichuan Jinmu Mining Co., Ltd 64.9%, Huang Xuejun 27% and Sichuan Xindongxin Automobile Service Co., Ltd with 5.1% of the shares of the club.

History
Sichuan Longfor F.C. was established on September 10, 2013 by Huang Xuejun after he gained investment of 17 million Yuan and the support from the local government in Santai County in Mianyang, Sichuan province to register the club with the Chinese Football Association and play in the China League Two division. Jia Jin was brought in as the club's first Head coach while trails took place to select the squad before the start of the 2014 league season. The first competitive game the club played was a league match away from home on April 26, 2014 against Pu'er Wanhao that they won 2–0 with Yu Di being the club's first goalscorer. In the club's debut season the club ultimately finished in sixth within the group stages and despite briefly appearing like they could make a push for a place within the promotion play-offs their hopes were dashed when Lijiang Jiayunhao beat them on August 30, 2014 in the 14th round 2–1 with a controversial penalty.

In the following league season Huang Xuejun admitted that the club were in financial difficulty and that the Xindahai Group would be investing into the club. After gaining financial stability results on the field saw the club improve and the club finished third within the league. With further investments coming from Sichuan Xindongxin Automobile Service Co., Ltd and then Sichuan Jinmu Mining Co., Ltd the club would become promotion play-off regulars. With the appointment of Li Bing at the start of the 2018 league season the club would finally go on to achieve their first promotion when they won 2018 China League Two division title without losing a single game.

The club was dissolved after they failed to submit the salary & bonus confirmation form before the 2020 season.

Ownership and naming history

 In January 2019

Coaching staff

Managerial history

  Jia Jin (2014)
  José Hernández (2014)
  Zhang Weizhe (2015)
  Jia Jin (2015)
  Zhang Weizhe (17 Feb 2016–7 May 2016)
  Vítor Pontes (7 May 2016–2 Nov 2016)
  Manuel Cajuda (5 Dec 2016–14 Oct 2017)
  Li Bing (4 Dec 2017–31 Dec 2019)

Results
All-time league rankings

As of the end of 2018 season.

 In group stage.

Key
 Pld = Played
 W = Games won
 D = Games drawn
 L = Games lost
 F = Goals for
 A = Goals against
 Pts = Points
 Pos = Final position

 DNQ = Did not qualify
 DNE = Did not enter
 NH = Not Held
 – = Does Not Exist
 R1 = Round 1
 R2 = Round 2
 R3 = Round 3
 R4 = Round 4

 F = Final
 SF = Semi-finals
 QF = Quarter-finals
 R16 = Round of 16
 Group = Group stage
 GS2 = Second Group stage
 QR1 = First Qualifying Round
 QR2 = Second Qualifying Round
 QR3 = Third Qualifying Round

References

External links
Club website

 
Defunct football clubs in China
2013 establishments in China
2020 disestablishments in China
Sport in Sichuan
Mianyang
Association football clubs established in 2013
Association football clubs disestablished in 2020